Carinodrillia pilsbryi is a species of sea snail, a marine gastropod mollusk in the family Pseudomelatomidae, the turrids and allies.

Description
The length of the shell varies between 23 mm and 50 mm.

Distribution
This species occurs from the Sea of Cortez, Western Mexico to Peru.

References

 Lowe, Herbert N. "New Marine Mollusca from West Mexico: Together with a List of Shells Collected at Punta Penasco, Sonora, Mexico." San Diego Society of Natural History, 1935.

External links
 

pilsbryi
Gastropods described in 1935